Chuang Chia-jung and Renata Voráčová were the defending champions, however Chuang chose not to participate. Voráčová partnered Xenia Knoll but lost in the quarterfinals to Ysaline Bonaventure and Sara Sorribes Tormo.

Mariana Duque Mariño and Wang Yafan won the title after defeating Sílvia Soler Espinosa and Barbora Štefková 6–3, 7–5 in the final.

Seeds

Draw

Draw

External links
Main Draw

Bol Open - Doubles
Croatian Bol Ladies Open